Aloe aaata is a species of aloe plant found in Saudi Arabia specifically in the Asir Province.  The aloe has a perennial life cycle and has evergreen leaves, additionally cuttings of the stem can be used for propagation of the plant along with offsets.

External links
 Aloe aaata at Plants of the World Online
 Aloe aaata at garden.org

Flora of Saudi Arabia
aaata